AD 87 (LXXXVII) was a common year starting on Monday (link will display the full calendar) of the Julian calendar. At the time, it was known as the Year of the Consulship of Augustus and Saturninus (or, less frequently, year 840 Ab urbe condita). The denomination AD 87 for this year has been used since the early medieval period, when the Anno Domini calendar era became the prevalent method in Europe for naming years.

Events

By place

Roman Empire 
 The Roman Julius Maternus  explores western Africa (approximate date). 
 Lyon, a city in Gaul, has a population of over 100,000 citizens (approximate date).
 Sextus Julius Sparsus gains power in the Roman Senate (approximate date).

Europe 
 Decebalus becomes king of Dacia.
</onlyinclude>

Births 
 Pothinus, bishop of Lyon (approximate date)
 Rupilia Faustina, Roman noblewoman (approximate date)

References 

0087

als:80er#Johr 87